The Webster Thomas High School is a public high school located in the town of  Webster, Monroe County, New York, U.S.A., and is one of two New York high schools operated by the Webster Central School District.

Sean Kingston Visit 
On Wednesday, Dec. 12, 2007, Sean Kingston performed a 20-minute concert for students followed by a question-and-answer session.

Footnotes

High schools in Monroe County, New York
Public high schools in New York (state)